The PSOL REDE Federation  is a federation of Brazilian parties formed in 2022 by the Socialism and Liberty Party (PSOL) and Sustainability Network (REDE). Its program and statute were published on 17 May 2022 and registered by the Superior Electoral Court on 26 May.

Composition

Electoral history

Legislative elections

References

2022 establishments in Brazil
Eco-socialism
Environmentalism in Brazil
Left-wing political party alliances
Political parties established in 2022
Political party alliances in Brazil
Progressivism